The Hamburg Blue Devils are an American football team in Hamburg, Germany. It was founded in 1992. The Blue Devils are one of the most successful American football clubs in Germany, having won four German Bowls as well as three Eurobowls. During the late 1990s and early 2000s, the clubs rivalry with the Braunschweig Lions dominated the game in the German Football League, with the two sides meeting in six German Bowls between 1998 and 2005 as well as the 1999 Eurobowl.

In the late 1990s, the club had become the most financially successful American football club in Europe, but by 2003, the club had to declare insolvency.

History
The Hamburg Blue Devils were formed in 1992 and began playing non-league football in September 1992. It continued to take part in tournaments in 1993, defeating a number of European top  clubs, including the German champions, the Munich Cowboys.

In 1994, the Blue Devils took part in the Football League of Europe, where they lost the final to the Stockholm Nordic Vikings, played in front  of 18,000 in Hamburg.

Unusually, the club was admitted to the American Football Bundesliga, the later German Football League, without having worked its way  up through the league system in 1995 and reached the German Bowl in its first attempt. There however, the Düsseldorf Panthers proved too strong and Hamburg lost 10–17.

The club's second season in the league brought triumphs and sadness. The team won both the German Bowl and the Eurobowl, however,  the team's head coach since 1992, George White, died two days before the play-off semi finals. In 1997, the Blue Devils were able to defend their European Football League title by winning the Eurobowl, but lost in the semi finals of the national championships. Finally, in 1998, the club won the Eurobowl for a third consecutive time, as the first club ever, but once more lost the German Bowl, to future bitter rival Braunschweig Lions.

The 1999 season was all about the Blue Devils versus the Lions, the two teams meeting both in the Eurobowl and the German Bowl. On both occasions, the Lions kept the upper hand, but the 30,000 that turned out to see the German Bowl at Hamburgs Volksparkstadion were a new record for the game in Germany.

The following season 2000 was a disaster for the club. With new coach and quarter back, the club played its first losing season in its short history and missed the play-offs. It did reach the Eurobowl playoffs once more but this time lost to the Bergamo Lions.

With a new coach and playing at the Millerntor-Stadion, the club began a new era of success in 2001. Three German Bowl victories were to follow, all against the Braunschweig Lions. However, not all went well for the club. Midway through the 2002 season, the coach left but the Blue Devils remained successful. In 2003, the club experienced financial trouble, having to declare insolvency. Despite this, the German Bowl was won in extra time in a narrow 37–36 victory.

The club somewhat declined from 2004 onwards, only reaching the quarter finals that year. In 2005, a last appearance in the German Bowl was made, but this time the Lions came out as the winners. Additionally, the clubs marketing agency had to declare insolvency, too, but the Blue Devils survived theirs and moved into their own stadium, the eVendi Arena. From 2005 to 2007, the club also faced some local competition in the form of NFL Europe team Hamburg Sea Devils.

From 2006 onwards, the performances of the Blue Devils dropped off. In 2006, the play-off semi finals could still be reached, in 2007 it was only the quarter finals and, in 2008, a fifth place meant the club did not play a post season at all. What followed was the withdrawal to the tier-three Regionalliga Nord, where the club played the 2009 and 2010 season without ever suffering a league defeat. However, in the promotion round, things were not as easy and the Blue Devils missed out on promotion in 2009 but were successful in 2010. In 2011, the club has risen to the second tier of German football, the GFL 2, a league it never played in before.

On 5 January 2011, the club announced that it would start a cooperation with the Hamburger SV with the aim of becoming a department of the club and, eventually, from 1 January 2012, all teams of the Blue Devils would become part of the multi-sports club HSV. The idea was floated as early as 1992 and the club will, in future, be known as the HSV Hamburg Blue Devils. In 2012, the club came seventh in the northern division of the GFL and failed to qualify for the play-off.

In January 2014 the club announced that it would withdraw its team from the GFL because of a loss of players and would restart in 2015. After not fielding a senior team in 2014 the club returned to league football for 2015, entering the tier five Verbandsliga Nord, where they finished third.

Teams
Apart from the senior men's team, the Blue Devils also operate a reserve side, a junior team, the Hamburg Junior Devils, ladies team, the Hamburg Blue Devilyns  and a flag team, the Hamburg Flag Devils.

Honours
 Eurobowl
 Champions: 1996–1998
 Runners-up: 1999, 2000
 German Bowl
 Champions: 1996, 2001–2003
 Runners-up: 1995, 1998, 1999, 2005
 EFL
 Participations: (7) 1996–2000, 2000, 2006
 GFL
 Northern Division champions: 1997, 2001
 Play-off qualification : (12) 1995–1999, 2001–2008
 League membership : (16) 1995–2008, 2012–2013
 GFL 2
 Northern Division champions: 2011
 Junior Bowl
 Champions: 1999

German Bowl appearances
The club's appearances in the German Bowl:

Recent seasons
Recent seasons of the Blue Devils:

 PR = Promotion round.
 QF = Quarter finals.
 SF = Semi finals.
 GB = German Bowl.

Charity bowls
The Blue Devils victory against St. Xavier University in 1995 was one of the first success for a European team against a US college team. The Devils also won against US college teams in 1997 and 1998.

The first known European victory against a US college team was in 1991. The Graz Giants of the Austrian Football League winning a game 32–23 against Albany University. The game was played in the United States on August 31, 1991.

References

External links

  Official Website
  German Football League official website
  Football History Historic American football tables from Germany

Sport in Hamburg
German Football League teams
American football teams in Germany
American football teams established in 1992
Hamburger SV
1992 establishments in Germany